William Mitchell (22 November 1910 – 30 November 1977) was an Irish footballer who played as a half-back.

Club career
Mitchell played as a half-back for Chelsea, amassing 108 league appearances and two goals.

International career
Mitchell was an international footballer for the Ireland national football team.

References

1910 births
1977 deaths
People from Lurgan
Association footballers from Northern Ireland
Pre-1950 IFA international footballers
Association football defenders
Cliftonville F.C. players
Lisburn Distillery F.C. players
Chelsea F.C. players
Bath City F.C. players